The UEFA Europa Conference League is a seasonal football competition established in 2021. It was envisaged as a way for UEFA to accommodate at least 34 of its national associations in group stage, in combination with the UEFA Champions League and the UEFA Europa League.

The winner automatically qualifies for the subsequent season's Europa League, unless they have already qualified for the Champions League through their domestic league.

List of finals

 The "Season" column refers to the season the competition was held, and wikilinks to the article about that season.
 The wikilinks in the "Score" column point to the article about that season's final game.

Performances

By club

By nation

See also
List of European Cup and UEFA Champions League finals
List of UEFA Cup and Europa League finals
List of UEFA Cup Winners' Cup finals
List of UEFA Super Cup matches
List of UEFA Intertoto Cup winners
List of UEFA Women's Cup and Women's Champions League finals

References

 
UEFA Europa Conference League
UEFA Europa Conference League